Marco Muraccini (born 25 February 1991) is a former San Marino international footballer who played as a midfielder.

International career
Muraccini won seven caps for San Marino at under-21 level. He made his senior debut on 14 August 2012, in a 3–2 defeat to Malta.

References

External links

1991 births
Living people
Sammarinese footballers
San Marino international footballers
Association football midfielders
A.S.D. Victor San Marino players